The 100 metres at the 2006 Commonwealth Games as part of the athletics programme were held at the Melbourne Cricket Ground on Sunday 19 March and Monday 20 March 2006.

The top three runners in each of the initial eight heats automatically qualified for the second round. The next eight fastest runners from across the heats also qualified. Those 32 runners competed in 4 heats in the second round, with the top four runners from each heat qualifying for the semifinals. There were two semifinals, and only the top four from each heat advanced to the final.

Records

Medals

Qualification

Going into the event, the top ten Commonwealth athletes as ranked by the International Association of Athletics Federations were:

Results
All times shown are in seconds.
 Q denotes qualification by place in heat.
 q denotes qualification by overall place.
 DNS denotes did not start.
 DNF denotes did not finish.
 DQ denotes disqualification.
 NR denotes national record.
 GR denotes Games record.
 WR denotes world record.
 PB denotes personal best.
 SB denotes season best.

Round 1

Round 2

Semi-finals

Final

References
Results

Men's 100
2006